Amahibelaha is a village development committee in Sunsari District in the Koshi Zone of south-eastern Nepal. At the time of the 1991 Nepal census it had a population of 4700 people living in 834 individual households. Amahibelha is a part of Barju Rural municipality.

References

Populated places in Sunsari District